The BMW R1200R is a standard motorcycle introduced in 2006 by BMW Motorrad. It replaces the R1150R, compared with which it has a  weight saving and 28% increase in power.

For model year 2015, a completely new R1200R with the same  liquid/air-cooled engine as the 2014/2015 R1200RT, but weighing 100 pounds less, was introduced.

For the 2019 Model Year, the R1200R was succeeded by the R1250R. The R1250R features a newer dual cam profile engine and has a TFT display.

References

External links

 

R1200R
Motorcycles powered by flat engines
Shaft drive motorcycles
Standard motorcycles
Motorcycles introduced in 2006